German submarine U-232 was a Type VIIC U-boat of Nazi Germany's Kriegsmarine during World War II.

The submarine was laid down on 17 January 1942 at the Friedrich Krupp Germaniawerft yard at Kiel as yard number 662, launched on 15 October and commissioned on 28 November under the command of Kapitänleutnant Ernst Ziehm.

After training with the 5th U-boat Flotilla at Kiel, U-232 was transferred to the 9th U-boat Flotilla in Brest on 1 May 1943, for front-line service. In one war patrol, the U-boat sank or damaged no merchant ships. She was a member of three wolfpacks.

U-232 was sunk on 9 July 1943 in the North Atlantic by a British aircraft.

Design
German Type VIIC submarines were preceded by the shorter Type VIIB submarines. U-232 had a displacement of  when at the surface and  while submerged. She had two shafts and two  propellers.

U-232 was fitted with five  torpedo tubes (four fitted at the bow and one at the stern), fourteen torpedoes, one  SK C/35 naval gun, 220 rounds, and an anti-aircraft gun. The boat had a complement of between forty-four and sixty.

Service history

Patrol and loss
U-232s inaugural patrol took her from Kiel to the Atlantic Ocean via the gap between Iceland and the Faroe Islands. While heading for the Bay of Biscay, she was attacked and sunk by a British RAF Wellington on 9 July 1943. Forty-six men died; there were no survivors.

Wolfpacks
U-232 took part in three wolfpacks, namely:
 Trutz (1 – 16 June 1943) 
 Trutz 2 (16 – 29 June 1943) 
 Geier 3 (30 June – 8 July 1943)

References

Bibliography

External links

German Type VIIC submarines
World War II submarines of Germany
World War II shipwrecks in the Atlantic Ocean
U-boats commissioned in 1942
U-boats sunk in 1943
U-boats sunk by US aircraft
1942 ships
Ships built in Kiel
Ships lost with all hands
Maritime incidents in July 1943